"Loose" is a song by rock band Therapy? and a single released on 17 July 1995 on A&M Records. The song is featured on the Infernal Love album. The single reached number 25 on the UK Singles Chart, and number 23 on the Irish Singles Chart. A digipak single was released two weeks later on 31 July 1995, reaching number 141 on the UK Singles Chart.

The single was released on CD, CD digipak, green 7" vinyl, and cassette.

Track listing

Live tracks recorded in the UK, June 1995.

Personnel
 Andy Cairns: vocals/guitar
 Fyfe Ewing: drums/backing vocals
 Michael McKeegan: bass/backing vocals
 Al Clay: producer
 Dave Porter: engineer, mixer (live tracks)
 Chris Leckie: mixer (live tracks)
 Photek: additional production & remix
 Anton Corbijn: photography
 Jeremy Pearce: design
 Simon Carrington: design

References

1995 singles
Therapy? songs
1995 songs
A&M Records singles
Songs written by Andy Cairns